Yana Djin (born Yana Nodarovna Dzhindzhikhashvili, 1969, in Tbilisi, Georgia) is a Georgian- American poet.

Life
In 1980, she emigrated to the United States where she studied philosophy.  Her first book of poetry Bits and Pieces of Conversations was published in the US in 1994. Her father is a writer Nodar Djin.

Her Russian translation poems were first published in 1997 in the Literaturnaya Gazeta under the heading "The New Literary Star" followed by the publications in the literary magazines Druzhba Narodov and Novy Mir.
Her translations of Vladimir Gandelsman appeared in Metamorphoses, and an anthology.

In 2000, Yana Djin's book of poetry (in English and Russian) Inevitable was published in Moscow to critical acclaim. In 2003 her third book of poetry Realm of Doubts was published by the OGI publishing house. She wrote a biweekly social-political column "Letters from America" for the English language Moscow News.

She lived in Washington, D.C., and appeared at DCAC. She lives in New York.

Works
"Untitled and Unrhymed or a Bit Too Personal", Произведения в системе Литсовет. 2002
Bits and Pieces of Conversations, Poetry, H. A. Frager & Company, 1994, 
''Yana Djin, Poem Hunter, 2009
Стихи Яны Джин из сборников «Неизбежное» и «Неприкаянность» в переводах Нодара Джина (Yana Djin. Inevitable. Moscow: Podkova, 2000; Realm of Doubts. Moscow: OGI, 2002).

Anthologies
High, John (ed) Crossing Centuries, Small Press Distribution, 1/9/2000,

References

External links
Yana Djin
Author's blog
"Feast of the Spirit", The Moscow Times Archive, 29 April 2000, Julia Flyagina

1969 births
Living people
Soviet emigrants to the United States
American women poets
21st-century American poets
American people of Georgian-Jewish descent
21st-century American women writers